Tapuli (also Romanized as Tapūlī) is a village in Holayjan Rural District, in the Central District of Izeh County, Khuzestan Province, Iran. At the 2006 census, its population was 21, in 5 families.

References 

Populated places in Izeh County